Eberhardtia is a genus of plant in the Sapotaceae described as a genus in 1920.

Eberhardtia is native to Laos, Vietnam, and southern China.

species

 Eberhardtia aurata  - Guangdong, Guangxi, Yunnan, Vietnam
 Eberhardtia krempfii  - Vietnam, Laos
 Eberhardtia tonkinensis  - Yunnan, Laos, Vietnam

References

 
Sapotaceae genera